Hrastnik is a small settlement in the hills east of Vojnik in eastern Slovenia. The area is part of the traditional region of Styria. It is now included with the rest of the Municipality of Vojnik in the Savinja Statistical Region.

References

External links
Hrastnik at Geopedia

Populated places in the Municipality of Vojnik